Benjamin-Constant Martha, also known under the name Constant Martha, (1820–1895) was a 19th-century French moralist and 
historian of ancient morality.

A graduate of the École normale supérieure, agrégé de lettres and docteur ès lettres, he was professor of literature at the lycée de Strasbourg, then held the chair of Latin eloquence at the Sorbonne and professor at the Collège de France. He was elected a member of the Académie des sciences morales et politiques in 1872.

He was Jules Martha's father and Paul Girard's stepfather.

Publications 
1854: De la Morale pratique dans les lettres de Sénèque (thesis) online
1854: Dionis philosophantis effigies (thèse complémentaire en latin)
1854: De la Morale pratique dans les lettres de Sénèque 
1865: Les Moralistes sous l'Empire romain, philosophes et poètes 
Includes La morale pratique dans les lettres de Sénèque. Un Poète stoïcien - Persia. La Vertu stoïque - Epictetus. L'Examen de conscience d'un empereur romain - Marcus Aurelius. La Prédication morale populaire - Dio Chrysostom. La Société romaine - Juvenal. Le Scepticisme religieux et philosophique - Lucian.
1866: Les Sophistes grecs dans l’Empire romain
1869: Le Poème de Lucrèce : morale, religion, science Read online
1883: Études morales sur l'antiquité. Includes: L'Éloge funèbre chez les Romains. Le Philosophe Carneades à Rome. Les Consolations dans l'Antiquité. L'Examen de conscience chez les anciens. Un Chrétien devenu paĭen. Un Paĭen devenu chrétien.
1884: La Délicatesse dans l'art
1896: Mélanges de littérature ancienne Incledes: L'Éducation des femmes grecques. Pindar. Les Romains à la comédie. Cicero and Lucretius. Augustus et les lettres. Sénèque.

Bibliography 
 Paul Janet,  Notice sur Benjamin-Constant Martha, Cerf, Versailles, 1895, 16 p., Gallica
 Jean-Yves Mariotte, « Benjamin Constant Martha », in Nouveau Dictionnaire de biographie alsacienne, vol. 25, (p. 2533)

External links 
 Notice on Benjamin-Constant Martha on Gallica

19th-century French historians
Academic staff of the Collège de France
Members of the Académie des sciences morales et politiques
École Normale Supérieure alumni
Writers from Strasbourg
1820 births
1895 deaths